Clara Millicent Knight (died 31 July 1950) was a British classicist and academic, specialising in comparative philology and classical literature.

Knight studied classics at King's College, London, graduating with a second class honours Bachelor of Arts (BA) degree in 1909. She taught at the University of London from 1910, rising to become Reader in Classics (1929–1945) at her alma mater King's College, London. In addition to her teaching, she was a Member of Council of the Hellenic Society and of the Council of the Classical Association.

Selected works

References

1950 deaths
Academics of King's College London
British classical scholars
Women classical scholars
Classical scholars of the University of London
Alumni of King's College London